Christopher ("Chris") Francis Black (born 1 January 1950 in Edinburgh) is a retired Scottish hammer thrower, who represented Great Britain at two consecutive Summer Olympics, starting in 1976 (Montreal). His best Olympic result was finishing in seventh place at the 1976 Summer Olympics, throwing 73.18 metres.

He held the Scottish record for the hammer throw from 1983 to 2015.

International competitions

References

External links
 
 

1950 births
Living people
Sportspeople from Edinburgh
Scottish male hammer throwers
British male hammer throwers
British masters athletes
Olympic athletes of Great Britain
Athletes (track and field) at the 1976 Summer Olympics
Athletes (track and field) at the 1980 Summer Olympics
Commonwealth Games bronze medallists for Scotland
Athletes (track and field) at the 1974 British Commonwealth Games
Athletes (track and field) at the 1978 Commonwealth Games
Athletes (track and field) at the 1982 Commonwealth Games
Athletes (track and field) at the 1986 Commonwealth Games
World Athletics Championships athletes for Great Britain
Commonwealth Games medallists in athletics
Medallists at the 1978 Commonwealth Games
Medallists at the 1982 Commonwealth Games